"Love and Hate" is a song from Ryuichi Sakamoto featuring former Frankie Goes to Hollywood singer Holly Johnson. Released as a single in 1994 from Sakamoto's album Sweet Revenge, the song was written by Sakamoto and Johnson. It reached No. 97 in the UK charts.

The song features Johnson on vocals. A music video was filmed to promote the single. Johnson came to work with Sakamoto due to his links with Frankie Goes to Hollywood manager Bob Johnson. At the time, Bob Johnson was the manager of Roddy Frame, who was a friend of Sakamoto.

Track listing
12" Single
"Love & Hate (Extended Mix)" - 5:31
"Love & Hate (NYC Personal Mix)" - 5:18
"Love & Hate (Edit)" - 4:10
"Love & Hate (Love Mix)" - 7:10
"Love & Hate (Hate Mix)" - 7:19

12" Single (UK promo)
"Love & Hate (Love Mix)" - 7:10
"Love & Hate (Hate Mix)" - 7:19
"Love & Hate (Extended Mix)" - 5:31
"Love & Hate (NYC Personal Mix)" - 5:18

12" Single (American promo)
"Love and Hate (Hate Mix)" - 7:19
"Love and Hate (Message Mix-Single Edit)" - 4:10
"Love and Hate (Love Mix)" - 7:10
"Love and Hate (NYC Personal Mix)" - 5:18

CD Single
"Love & Hate (Edit)" - 3:36
"Love & Hate (Love Mix)" - 7:10
"Love & Hate (Hate Mix)" - 7:19
"Love and Hate (NYC Personal Mix)" - 5:18
"Love & Hate (Extended Mix)" - 5:31

CD Single (European Limited Edition Digipack release)
"Love & Hate (Edit)" - 3:36
"Love & Hate (Love Mix)" - 7:10
"Love & Hate (Hate Mix)" - 7:19
"Love and Hate (NYC Personal Mix)" - 5:18
"Love & Hate (Extended Mix)" - 5:31

Charts

Remixes
"Love & Hate" (Edit)
"Love & Hate" (Love mix)
"Love & Hate" (Hate mix)
"Love & Hate" (NYC Personal mix)
"Love & Hate" (Extended mix)
"Love & Hate" (Message Mix-single edit)
"Love & Hate" (Butterfly of Digable Planets mix) 
"Love & Hate" (Marshall Jefferson mix) 
"Love & Hate" (Album mix)

References

1994 singles
Holly Johnson songs
Songs written by Ryuichi Sakamoto
Songs written by Holly Johnson
1994 songs
Elektra Records singles